Gamasellus caucasicus is a species of mite in the family Ologamasidae.

References

caucasicus
Articles created by Qbugbot
Animals described in 1981